Bulldog Drummond Escapes is a 1937 American film directed by James P. Hogan starring Ray Milland as Capt. Hugh "Bulldog" Drummond. Paramount continued with the Bulldog Drummond series, producing seven more films over the next two years. They replaced Milland with John Howard.

Plot
Captain Hugh 'Bulldog' Drummond (Ray Milland) has just returned to England. As he is driving home in the dark, a young woman jumps out in front of his car. He misses Phyllis Clavering (Heather Angel), but she falls to the ground. As he tries to revive her, he hears a shout for help, then gunshots. As he goes to investigate, the woman drives away with Drummond's car. He is soon able to trace her to nearby Greystone Manor, and when he goes there to meet her, she urges him to help her get out of a desperate situation.

Cast
 Ray Milland as Capt. Hugh "Bulldog" Drummond
 Sir Guy Standing as 	Inspector Col. Sir Reginald Nielson
 Heather Angel as Miss Phyllis Clavering
 Reginald Denny as Algy Longworth
 Porter Hall as Maj. Norman Merridew
 Fay Holden as Mrs. Natalie Seldon, Maj. Merridew's sister (also referred to as Miss Seldon)
 E.E. Clive as "Tenny" Tennison
 Walter Kingsford as 'Professor' Stanton
 P.J. Kelly as Stiles - the butler
 Charles McNaughton as Chief Constable Higgins
 Clyde Cook as Constable Alf
 Frank Elliott as Bailey
 David Clyde as Gower
 Doris Lloyd as Nurse
 Barry Macollum as Blodgson (uncredited)

References

External links
 
 
 
 
 

Films based on Bulldog Drummond
1937 films
1930s English-language films
American black-and-white films
1930s thriller films
Films directed by James Patrick Hogan
American thriller films
1930s American films